Iona Sara Macintyre  McDonald OBE (born 18 November 1954) has been Lord Lieutenant of Ayrshire and Arran since 2017.

McDonald was educated at Cumnock Academy and graduated from Glasgow University with a Master of Arts in 1976 and a law degree in 1978. She is a solicitor, and previously worked for the Ayr firm Mathie-Morton, Black and Buchanan, where she became partner in 1982. She was appointed as a temporary sheriff in 1994, was the sheriff of North Strathclyde from 2000 to 2007; and senior sheriff of Kilmarnock since then.  She was appointed Officer of the Order of the British Empire (OBE) for services to law and order in the Queen's Birthday Honours' List 2019.

References

Lord-Lieutenants of Ayrshire and Arran
1954 births
Living people
People educated at Cumnock Academy
Alumni of the University of Glasgow
Scottish solicitors
People from Ayrshire